Tahdhīb al-Āthār is a collection of hadith by Muhammad ibn Jarir al-Tabari. Al-Kattani described it as one of al-Tabari's amazing works, although, he did not complete it.

Description 

Al-Tabari compiled this work as inclusive of hadith, an examination of their authenticity, and the explanation of each. He arranged his work according to the companion narrating it, beginning with Abu Bakr al-Siddiq. He completed the hadith of the ten companions promised paradise, Ahl al-Bayt and their clients, as well as a large segment of `Abd Allah ibn `Abbas's hadith.  

Al-Tabari gathered those hadith he determined to be authentic from each of these companions and discussed the various routes of their individual hadith and any hidden defects. He then discussed the understanding of each hadith, the differing opinions of the scholars and their rationale, and the definitions of any unusual terminology. He died in 922 before completing it.  

Al-Kattani praised Tahdhib as being from the author's amazing works.

See also
 List of Sunni books
 Kutub al-Sittah
 Sahih Muslim
 Jami al-Tirmidhi
 Sunan Abu Dawood
 Jami' at-Tirmidhi
 Either: Sunan ibn Majah, Muwatta Malik

References

9th-century Arabic books
10th-century Arabic books
Sunni literature
Hadith
Hadith collections
Sunni hadith collections
Works by Muhammad ibn Jarir al-Tabari